Rob Langley is an English professional rugby union player who played for Gloucester

References

1991 births
Living people
English rugby union players
Rugby union players from Exeter
Rugby union flankers